Dianа Yorgova (born 9 December 1942 in Lovech) is a former Bulgarian athlete, who competed mainly in the Long Jump. She competed for Bulgaria at the 1972 Summer Olympics held in Munich, Germany in the Long Jump where she won the silver medal. She also competed at the 1964 Summer Olympics.

Yorgova is married to Bulgarian gymnast Nikola Prodanov, whom she married during the 1964 Summer Olympics in the Olympic village.

References

External links

1942 births
Living people
Bulgarian female long jumpers
Olympic silver medalists for Bulgaria
Athletes (track and field) at the 1964 Summer Olympics
Athletes (track and field) at the 1972 Summer Olympics
Olympic athletes of Bulgaria
People from Lovech
Medalists at the 1972 Summer Olympics
Olympic silver medalists in athletics (track and field)
Universiade medalists in athletics (track and field)
Universiade silver medalists for Bulgaria
Medalists at the 1961 Summer Universiade